Kingdom of the Blind (2004) is an original novel written by David Bishop and based on the long-running British science fiction comic strip Judge Dredd. It is Bishop's fifth Judge Dredd novel. He later blogged: "I swore I'd never, ever, ever write another Judge Dredd novel."

Synopsis
Senior judges from all over the world arrive in Mega-City One to negotiate an extradition treaty and Judge Dredd is assigned to manage security. A major criminal mastermind chooses this moment to try to take over the city.

External links
Kingdom of the Blind at the 2000 AD website (note: the "reprint material" section erroneously refers to another story).

References

Novels by David Bishop
Judge Dredd novels